, also known as G. G. Sato, is a former professional player for the Philadelphia Phillies organization, Saitama Seibu Lions, Chiba Lotte Marines, and Fortitudo Baseball Bologna.

Career
Sato began his professional career signing with the Philadelphia Phillies organization in 2000  before making his on field debut for the Batavia Muckdogs of Minor League Baseball in 2001 hitting .261 with 4 home runs and 21 RBI's. In 2002 he played again in Batavia as well as the Gulf Coast League. He was promoted to the Lakewood BlueClaws for the 2003 season and hit .247 with 6 home runs and 42 RBI's.

Sato was selected in the seventh round by the Saitama Seibu Lions in 2003 draft upon returning to Japan, where he would play from 2004 until 2011.

Sato briefly played in Fortitudo Baseball Bologna in the Italian Baseball League in 2012 as well as Chiba Lotte Marines in 2013.

International career
Sato played for Japan at the 2008 Summer Olympics.

Personal
Sato got his nickname G. G. while at Hosei University because it was thought he had the face of an old man, or jiji (爺). Sato worked as a security guard upon returning to Japan in 2003 before trying out for the Lions. He now works for his father's company, Travers, in Japan.

References

External links

 Career statistics - NPB.jp 

1978 births
Living people
Baseball catchers
Baseball players at the 2008 Summer Olympics
Batavia Muckdogs players
Chiba Lotte Marines players
Florida Complex League Phillies players
Hosei University alumni
Japanese expatriate baseball players in Italy
Japanese expatriate baseball players in the United States
Lakewood BlueClaws players
Nippon Professional Baseball first basemen
Nippon Professional Baseball left fielders
Olympic baseball players of Japan
People from Ichikawa, Chiba
Saitama Seibu Lions players
Seibu Lions players